Phelsuma borai is a species of gecko, a lizard in the family Gekkonidae. The species is endemic to Madagascar.

Etymology
The specific name, borai, is in honor of Malagasy herpetologist Parfait Bora.

Geographic range
P. borai is found in the Melaky region of western Madagascar.

Habitat

Description
Dorsally, P. borai is grayish brown; ventrally it is whitish. Unlike most other species in its genus, it has no green or red coloration.

Reproduction
The mode of reproduction of P. borai is unknown.

References

Further reading
Gardner CJ, Raxworthy CJ, Metcalfe K, Raselimanana AP, Smith RJ, Davies ZG (2015). "Comparing Methods for Prioritising Protected Areas for Investment: A Case Study Using Madagascar's Dry Forest Reptiles". PLoS ONE 10 (7): e0132803.
Glaw F, Köhler J, Vences M (2009). "A new species of cryptically coloured day gecko (Phelsuma) from the Tsingy de Bemaraha National Park in western Madagascar". Zootaxa 2195: 61–68. (Phelsuma borai, new species).
Glaw F, Rösler H (2015). "Taxonomic checklist of the day geckos of the genera Phelsuma Gray, 1825 and Rhoptropella Hewitt, 1937 (Squamata: Gekkonidae)". Vertebrate Zoology 65 (2): 247–283.

Phelsuma
Geckos of Africa
Reptiles of Madagascar
Endemic fauna of Madagascar
Reptiles described in 2009
Taxa named by Frank Glaw
Taxa named by Jörn Köhler
Taxa named by Miguel Vences